George Burnett,  LLD, WS (1822–1890) was a long-serving Scottish officer of arms.

Life
He was born on 9 March 1822, the second son of John Burnett, 5th Laird of Kemnay in Aberdeenshire. He trained as a lawyer (normal for the Lord Lyon) and in 1860 appears as an advocate in Edinburgh living at 21 Ainslie Place on the Moray Estate. He was appointed Lord Lyon King of Arms in 1866 and served in that post until his death in 1890, being known in this period as George Burnett, Lord Lyon. 

He died on 23 January 1890 and is buried in the churchyard of St John's Church on Princes Street.

Arms

See also
King of Arms
Herald
Pursuivant
Heraldry

References

External links
Court of the Lord Lyon
The Heraldry Society of Scotland

1822 births
1890 deaths
Lord Lyon Kings of Arms
Scottish genealogists
19th-century Scottish judges